Sarvadaman D. Banerjee is an Indian film and television actor known for his works in Hindi cinema, Bengali cinema and Telugu cinema. He is best known for playing Krishna in Ramanand Sagar's hit television series Krishna (1993). He played the title role in films such as Adi Shankaracharya (1983), which won the National Film Award for Best Feature Film, and Swami Vivekananda. In the 1986 film Sirivennela, he played a blind flutist.
He has played the role of PKR (Chief Minister) in the upcoming Telugu Film Godfather.

Personal life
Banerjee was born into a Bengali Brahmin family on 14 March 1965, in Magarwara, Unnao, Uttar Pradesh. He went to St. Aloysius School, Kanpur and graduated from the Pune Film Institute. He now teaches meditation in Rishikesh. Currently he supports an NGO Pankh which provides free education to slum children and livelihood skills to underprivileged women of Uttarakhand.

Filmography

Film

Television

References

External links

Indian male film actors
Indian male television actors
Living people
Male actors from Uttar Pradesh
Bengali male actors
Male actors in Bengali cinema
Film and Television Institute of India alumni
1965 births
Male actors in Hindi television
20th-century Indian male actors
People from Unnao district